Ferencváros is a district in Budapest.

Ferencváros may also refer to:

Ferencvárosi TC (Torna Club), a sports club located in Ferencváros, Budapest
Ferencvárosi TC (football)